Kaskazini B District (Wilaya ya Kaskazini B in Swahili)  is one of two administrative districts of Unguja North Region in Tanzania. The district is comparable in size to the land area of Cook Islands. The district has a water border to the east and west by the Indian Ocean. The district is bordered to the south west by Mjini Magharibi Region, the southeast by Unguja South Region and to the north by Kaskazini A District. The district seat (capital) is the small town of Mahonda. According to the 2012 census, the district has a total population of 81,675.

Geography
Located in the lowland region of the island, which makes up about 95% of the land on Kaskazini B, and the other portion, which is dominated by coral characteristics, are the two main components of the landscape. The majority of the district is covered by lowland, with the coastal region, particularly in the west and east, is where the coral land can be found. The region experiences tropical weather, with daytime highs of 20 to 40 degrees Celsius. Additionally, it has a bimodal rainfall pattern, with a protracted rainy season (known in Swahili as Masika) and a brief wet season (known as vuli in Swahili). While the short rainy season occurs in the months of September or October, the long rainy season lasts from March or April through May. During the long wet season, the district receives between 900 mm and 1,200 mm of rainfall, while during the short rainy season, 400 mm to 500 mm. The region can produce a variety of crops and raise livestock because to this rainfall pattern.

Demographics
Kaskazini B district has a total population of 81,675, or 6.2% of Zanzibar's population, according to the Population Census of 2012. Misufini shehia has the largest population in the district at 7,986 people. With 5,582 persons, Kitope comes in second. The smallest shehia in the district, Kiongwe Kidogo shehia, has only 391 residents.

Economy
As with most of Unguja North Region, the  district's economy is dominated with the services industry. Tourism remains the biggest income earner in the district. However, agriculture is at the heart of the district, Paddy, sweet potatoes, cassava, yams, millet, spices, bananas, and many kinds of fruits and vegetables are the main crops grown in the district. When the district is compared to other crop-producing regions, the figures that are currently available show a comparatively low level of productivity. Paddy is a prime illustration of this. The government views paddy (rice) as a priority crop due to the nature of island consumption. Njia ya Mtoni Shehia has the largest land allocated to farming crowing the most cassava.

Administration
The local government authority (LGA) and the central government make up Kaskazini B's two-tier system of governance. The district director serves as the head of the LGA, whilst the district commissioner (DC), who is supported by the district administrative secretary, serves as the head of the central government (DAS). Agriculture, health, education, national identity, communication, human resources, youth, cooperatives, planning, forestry, sports and culture, livestock, fishery, children and women, legal, water, sports, and coordination are among the 18 departments that make up the DC's office.

Administrative subdivisions
As of 2016, Kaskazini B District was administratively divided into 10 wards and 44 Shehias.

Wards

 Misufini
 Mafufuni
 Vijibweni
 Mkataleni

 Kiwengwa
 Mbaleni
 Fujoni
 Mahonda

Shehias

 Done Mchagani
 Donge Karange
 Donge Kipange
 Donge Mbiji
 Donge Mnyimbi
 Donge Mtambile
 Donge Vijibweni
 Fujoni
 kidazini
 Kinduni
 Kiombamvua

 Kilombero
 Kiongwe Kidogo
 Kinduni
 Kisongoni
 Kitope
 Kiwengwa
 Kwagube
 Mbaleni
 Mafufuni
 Mgambo
 Misufini
 Mkadini

 Muwanda
 Njia ya Mtoni
 Pangeni
 Upenja
 Zingwezingwe
 Mahonda
 Mgambo
 Majenzi
 Makoba
 Mkadini
 Mkataleni
 Mangapwani

Education & Health
A total of 12 secondary schools, 20 primary schools, and 19 pre-primary schools are located in Kaskazini B.There are altogether 15 primary health care units in the Kaskazini B district (PHCUs). Along with Donge Mchangani and Donge Vijibweni, the list also includes Fujoni, Kiombamvua, Kiongwe, Kitope (Private), Kiwengwa, and Mahonda. Additionally, Mahonda Medical Clinic (private), Makoba, Misufini, Upenja, Zingwezingwe, Kitope Dispensary RC. Two of these PHCUs are privately held, and the other eight are publicly owned.

References

Districts of Unguja North Region